Sakurada (written: ,  or  lit. "cherry blossom field") is a Japanese surname. Notable people with the surname include:

, Japanese actor and singer
, Japanese singer and actress
, Japanese footballer
, Japanese professional wrestler
, Japanese opera singer
Sakurada Sadakuni, Japanese samurai
, Japanese footballer
, Japanese general
, Japanese politician

Fictional characters
, a character in the manga series Sailor Moon
, protagonist of the manga series Rozen Maiden
, a character in the manga series Crayon Shinchan

Japanese-language surnames